Long intergenic non-protein coding RNA 312 is a protein that in humans is encoded by the LINC00312 gene.

References

Further reading 

Human proteins